Feagaiga Stowers (born 17 November 2000) is a Samoan weightlifter. She competed in the women's +90 kg event at the 2018 Commonwealth Games, winning the gold medal.

At the 2022 Oceania Online Cup she set three new Oceania records and won best overall female.

She was selected as the only female weightlifter in the Samoan team for the 2022 Commonwealth Games in Birmingham. She won silver in the women's over-87kg category.

Major results

References

External links

2000 births
Living people
Samoan female weightlifters
Place of birth missing (living people)
Weightlifters at the 2018 Commonwealth Games
Weightlifters at the 2022 Commonwealth Games
Commonwealth Games gold medallists for Samoa
Commonwealth Games silver medallists for Samoa
Commonwealth Games medallists in weightlifting
Medallists at the 2018 Commonwealth Games
Medallists at the 2022 Commonwealth Games